Edward Yau Tang-wah, GBS, JP (born 28 April 1960, Hong Kong) is a Hong Kong politician. He was the Secretary for the Environment from 2007 to 2012, and from 2012 to 2017, he was the Director of the Chief Executive's Office of Hong Kong. He served as Secretary for Commerce and Economic Development from 2017 to 2022.

Career
Yau joined the Administrative Service in August 1981 and earned more than 30 years of public administration experience. During his years as a civil servant, he was Deputy Director-General of Trade (later renamed Deputy Director-General of Trade and Industry), Director-General of the Hong Kong Economic and Trade Office in Washington, and Deputy Secretary for Education and Manpower, and Director of Information Services.

Yau was the Secretary for the Environment from 2007 to 2012. His responsibilities covered environmental protection, energy, and sustainable development. Nature conservation was also one of his main tasks and with his efforts, he established the Hong Kong Geopark which showcases the unique geological features in northeast Hong Kong. The Park obtained the UNESCO Global Geopark status in 2011.

From 2012 to 2017, he was the Director of the Chief Executive's Office of Hong Kong, and his responsibilities were to assist the Chief Executive in formulating policies and setting policy goals and priorities; and to maintain close contacts with Executive and Legislative Councillors, political parties as well as the public sector to enlist their support for Government work.

In 2020, after RTHK journalist Yvonne Tong asked WHO assistant director-general Bruce Aylward about the status of Taiwan, Yau claimed that the show had violated the "One China" principle.

In September 2020, after the United States required that goods made in Hong Kong be labelled as "Made in China," Yau filed a complaint to the United States, stating that such a rule was unreasonable.

In January 2021, Yau said that a policy to require SIM card registration, where users of SIM cards would need to link their IDs, was necessary. In response, some sellers of pre-paid SIM cards said that they might lose their business, and that it would not prevent criminal activity, as criminals could use SIM cards from overseas.

In February 2021, Yau said that his bureau was investigating complaints into RTHK and that he had requested RTHK to conduct a thorough review of its programming. Following a report that said RTHK had "serious inadequacies" that required changes, Yau claimed that the government was not trying to weaken RTHK's editorial independence. In March 2021, after two people asked why some episodes on RTHK had been axed, Yau defended the decisions and said "There is no need for the public to discuss whether a programme should be screened or not."

In July 2021, Yau dismissed claims that the National Security Law would affect the city's creative freedom. In August 2021, Yau announced the introduction of a new film censorship law with punishments of up to three years in jail and fines of up to HK$1 million ($128,000) for anyone screening films containing material in violation of the new law. Yau claimed that the law would not compromise freedom of speech.

In August 2021, Yau defended his decision to allow Nicole Kidman to skip quarantine when flying from Australia to Hong Kong, when others, including residents of Hong Kong, must undergo hotel quarantine. Athletes representing Hong Kong also must quarantine. Yau later during a TV interview claimed that Kidman's trip to a clothing store could have been part of a "costume fitting".

Education
Edward Yau graduated from the University of Hong Kong in 1981, and received further education at Oxford University and Harvard University.

References

External links
Mr Edward Yau Tang-wah biodata

1960 births
Alumni of the University of Hong Kong
Alumni of the University of Oxford
Government officials of Hong Kong
Harvard University alumni
Hong Kong civil servants
Living people
Recipients of the Gold Bauhinia Star